Flitestar was a South African commercial airline that operated from 1991 to 1994.

Company history 

Flitestar was the first South African airline to directly challenge the monopoly of South African Airways (SAA). It was a subsidiary of Trek Airways; the actual name of the airline was Trek Airways Flitestar, but it operated under the brand name Flitestar. The airline began operations on 16 October 1991 using four new leased Airbus A320-211 aircraft.

Flitestar concentrated on serving the business market without neglecting other passengers, which gained it up to 25% of the domestic market with load factors of 63% or more.
On 11 April 1994 Flitestar and Trek Airways ceased operations.

Flitestar Aviation Ltd is a British based Air Charter Company, founded in 2019 and based in Cheshire, United Kingdom specializing in large commercial jet charter services worldwide.

Destinations 

Flitestar served the following destinations:

Alexander Bay
Cape Town
Durban
George
Johannesburg
Port Elizabeth

Walvis Bay

Fleet

References

External links 
Flitestar TimeTables
Fleet information
Flitestar A320 picture

Defunct airlines of South Africa
Airlines established in 1991
Airlines disestablished in 1994
1994 disestablishments in South Africa
South African companies established in 1991